Phyllomedusa bahiana is a species of frog in the family Hylidae endemic to Bahia and Brazil. Scientists have seen it in mountain habitats, between 280 and 1000 meters above sea level.

References

Frogs of South America
Endemic fauna of Brazil
Amphibians described in 1925
bahiana